L'amore difficile (internationally released as Of Wayward Love and as Sex Can Be Difficult) is a 1962 Italian comedy anthology film. The film represents the directorial debut of the four authors, who were however all experienced in other areas of the film industry (Manfredi and Bonucci as actors, Lucignani and Sollima as writers). The four episodes are based on short stories by well-known Italian novelists ( Mario Soldati, Alberto Moravia, Italo Calvino and Ercole Patti) and share the themes of love and betrayal.

The film was co-produced with West Germany where it was released with the title Schwierige Liebe.

Cast

Le donne 
Enrico Maria Salerno: The man
Catherine Spaak: Valeria
Claudia Mori: Bruna
(directed by Sergio Sollima)

L'avaro 
Vittorio Gassman: Tullio Monari
Nadia Tiller: Elena De Gasperis
Lilla Brignone: Tullio's mother
(directed by Luciano Lucignani)

L'avventura di un soldato 
Nino Manfredi: The soldier
Fulvia Franco: The widow
(directed by Nino Manfredi)

Il serpente 
Gastone Moschin: The police sergeant
Bernhard Wicki: Bernhard, the husband
Lilli Palmer: Hilde, the wife
(directed by Alberto Bonucci)

References

External links

1962 films
1960s Italian-language films
Commedia all'italiana
1962 comedy films
Films based on works by Alberto Moravia
Films scored by Piero Umiliani
1962 directorial debut films
Adaptations of works by Italo Calvino
1960s Italian films